Sigrid Teresa Corneo (born 27 April 1971) is a retired Slovenian professional road cyclist of Italian descent. Holding a dual citizenship, she represented her nation Slovenia, as a 37-year-old, at the 2008 Summer Olympics, and has mounted second-place finishes in both road race and time trial at the Slovenian Championships in 2010. Before her official retirement from competitive cycling in 2010, Corneo rode for Italy's Top Girls Fassa Bortolo pro cycling team in the women's elite professional events.

Corneo qualified for the Slovenian squad in the women's road race at the 2008 Summer Olympics in Beijing by receiving a single berth from the UCI World Cup. She successfully completed a grueling race with a forty-ninth-place effort in 3:39:29, surpassing Canadian rider Alex Wrubleski by exactly seven seconds.

Career highlights
2004
 3rd Vuelta Ciclista Feminina a El Salvador (Road), El Salvador
 2nd Stage 3
2005
 3rd Vuelta Ciclista Feminina a El Salvador (Road), El Salvador
 1st Stage 4
 3rd Stage 4, Tour Féminin en Limousin, Rochechouart (FRA)
 4th Stage 1, Tour Féminin en Limousin, Dun-le-Palestel (FRA)
 8th Stage 3a, Tour Féminin en Limousin, Chaptelat (FRA)
2006
 2nd Overall, Grand Prix International de Dottignies, Belgium 
 2nd Stage 2, Giro d'Italia Donne, Formello (ITA)
 3rd Stage 4, Tour du Grand Montréal, Canada
 3rd Stage 8, Giro d'Italia Donne, Fossano (ITA)
2007
 2nd Overall, Tour Féminin en Limousin, France
 1st Stage 2, Saint-Sulpice-le-Guérétois
 3rd Stage 3, Tour de l'Ardèche, Cruas (FRA)
2008
 3rd Stage 4, Tour Féminin en Limousin, Sainte-Feyre (FRA)
 49th Olympic Games (Road), Beijing (CHN)
2009
 6th Overall, Route de France Féminine, France
 5th Stage 4, Saint-Pourçain-sur-Sioule
2010
 2nd Slovenian Championships (Road), Ptuj (SLO)
 2nd Slovenian Championships (ITT), Plave (SLO)

References

External links
 
 NBC 2008 Olympics profile

1971 births
Living people
Slovenian female cyclists
Cyclists at the 2008 Summer Olympics
Olympic cyclists of Slovenia
Sportspeople from Lecco
Slovenian people of Italian descent
Cyclists from the Province of Lecco